Andrei Vladimirovich Karpovich (born 18 January 1981) is a Kazakh football manager and a former player who is currently manager of Aktobe.

Career

Club
Karpovich started his career in his home town Semey playing for FC Elimay, and has since played for a number of different teams, finally signing for Russian side FC Dinamo Moskva in 2007. In February 2009, he transferred to the Kazakh team FC Lokomotiv Astana.

International
Karpovich scored Kazakhstan's first-ever goal in a competitive match after entering UEFA. The game was against Ukraine in a 2006 FIFA World Cup qualification opener. He has made 49 international appearances for the Kazakhstan national football team.

Managerial
On 15 October 2018, Karpovich being appointed as Caretaker Manager of FC Kairat after Carlos Alós left by mutual consent.

On 3 January 2019, Karpovich was announced as FC Okzhetpes manager for the 2019 Kazakhstan Premier League season.

Career statistics

International goals

References 
 
 

Notes

External links
 
 

1981 births
Living people
Kazakhstani footballers
Kazakhstani expatriate footballers
Association football midfielders
Kazakhstan international footballers
Expatriate footballers in Russia
FC Spartak Semey players
FC Irtysh Pavlodar players
FC Rostov players
FC Dynamo Moscow players
FC Kairat players
FC Ordabasy players
FC Astana players
FC Altai Semey players
FC Atyrau players
FC Aktobe players
FC Shakhter Karagandy players
Russian Premier League players
Kazakhstan Premier League players
Kazakhstani football managers
Kazakhstan national football team managers
FC Okzhetpes managers
FC Kyzylzhar managers
FC Aktobe managers
Kazakhstan Premier League managers
Sportspeople from Semey